Gidijala is a neighbourhood in Anandapuram Mandal, Visakhapatanam District of Andhra Pradesh, India.

Transport
APSRTC routes

References

Neighbourhoods in Visakhapatnam